Petrifaction is the replacement of organic matter by minerals in fossilization.

Petrifaction may also refer to:
An architectural term – see Classical architecture#Petrification
Petrifaction in mythology and fiction
 "Petrified", a song by Fort Minor from The Rising Tied

See also 
 Putrefaction